California's gold may refer to:
 California's Gold, a travel series on public television
 California Gold Rush, a period from 1848 to 1855

See also
 Gold in California